The Northwest Tower, popularly known as the Coyote Building, is a 12-story art deco building at the corner of North Avenue and Milwaukee Avenue in Chicago. It was designed by Perkins, Chatten & Hammond and built between 1928 and 1929.

Overview
The Northwest Tower is one of the first skyscrapers in Chicago to have been constructed outside the downtown area. The tower was built on the site of the Noel State Bank, near the Damen stop on the Chicago 'L'.  It was originally marketed to attorneys, doctors, and other professionals. In the 1980s, it became home to the Tower Coyote Gallery, reportedly named because artists thought the building resembled a howling coyote. Over the next two decades, the surrounding neighborhood held an annual arts festival called Around the Coyote. In 2008, the Chicago Zoning Board approved plans to convert the building into a hotel, but financial difficulties prevented the building's owner from moving ahead with the project.

Hotel
In 2012, the property was purchased by a venture backed by Don Wilson and AJ Capita with the intent to renovate the property into a boutique hotel. Hotel Robey, named after the prior name for Damen Avenue, offers 69 rooms and Cafe Robey serving French-American cuisine.  The hotel is operated by Grupo Habita, a Mexico-based hotel group with 14 hotels in Mexico and one in New York.

References

External links
Northwest Tower Building/Coyote Building. ExploreChicago.org

Office buildings completed in 1929
Skyscraper hotels in Chicago
1929 establishments in Illinois